Walter George Feltham (23 April 1864 – 23 September 1904) was an English first-class cricketer, a left-handed batsman who bowled left-arm fast and made his debut for Hampshire against Surrey in 1884. On debut, Feltham took three wickets. Feltham's second game for the club came against Sussex, where Feltham took two wickets in the match.

Feltham's third and final first-class appearance for Hampshire came against Somerset. Feltham took his career best figures in Somerset's first innings, taking 4/54. In Somerset's second innings Feltham took a further 3/41. Feltham's final career bowling average was twelve wickets at 9.37.

Feltham died at Ringwood, Hampshire on 23 September 1904.

External links
Walter Feltham at Cricinfo
Walter Feltham at CricketArchive

1864 births
1904 deaths
People from Ringwood, Hampshire
English cricketers
Hampshire cricketers